Zelizer is  a surname. Notable people with the surname include:

Julian E. Zelizer (born 1969), American political scholar and author, son of Viviana
Viviana Zelizer (born 1946), American sociologist

See also
 Zerizer